The 2020 CAFA U-19 Women's Futsal Championship was the first edition of the CAFA U-19 Women's Futsal Championship, the international youth futsal championship organized by the CAFA for the women's under-19 national teams of Central Asia. Tajikistan hosted the tournament between 24 and 29 January 2022. All CAFA's members entered the tournaments.

Iran won the title undefeated to become the first CAFA U-19 Women's Futsal Championship champion.

Participating nations
All CAFA member national teams entered the tournament.

Match officials
Referees

  Mohammad Tamim Hussaini
  Mohammad Latif Sharifi
  Fariba Kaabi Kermanshai
  Fahimeh Fatahi
  Talantbek Raimberdiev
  Eldiiar Keldibekov
  Behruz Murtazoev
  Suhrob Sattorov
  Timur Ramazanov
  Halida Eshniyazova
  Askarbay Arzibekov
  Nikita Afinogenov

Main Tournament
Times are TJT (UTC+5).

Goalscorers

Awards
The following awards were given at the conclusion of the tournament:

References

External links

2020 in Asian futsal
Sport in Dushanbe
2020 in youth association football
u-19